Tony Ensor may refer to:

 Tony Ensor (rugby union, born 1949), Ireland rugby union player
 Tony Ensor (rugby union, born 1991), New Zealand rugby union player